Ronald C. Rice (born February 17, 1968) is an American Democratic Party politician, who served on the Newark Municipal Council from 2006 to 2014. He represented the West Ward, comprising the neighborhoods of Vailsburg, Ivy Hill, West Side, Fairmount and Roseville. Rice chose not to run for re-election in the 2014 municipal election.

Background
Rice was born and raised in Newark; he's the son of Ronald L. Rice. in 1986, he graduated from the Pingry School. He received his BA at  American University and his JD from Seton Hall University School of Law .

Council Member
Rice first ran for Municipal Council in 2002, and election documented in the film Street Fight. In 2006, Ron won the race for West Ward Councilman and was sworn into office with newly elected Mayor Cory A. Booker on July 1, 2006.

2012 congressional bid
The Democratic primary victor was heavily favored to win the special election, which would allow the winner to represent the current 10th Congressional District from November 6, 2012 – January 3, 2013; as well as the general election, whose winner will serve the new 10th Congressional District for the two-year term from January 3, 2013 – January 3, 2015.

Also competing for that nomination were Dennis R. Flynn of Glen Ridge, state Senator Nia Gill, Newark Councilman Donald Payne Jr. (son of the congressman), Irvington Mayor Wayne Smith, and Cathy Wright of Newark. Payne won in a landslide, garnering 60 percent of the vote. Rice received 19 percent, Gill 17 percent, and Smith, Flynn and Wright combined for about 5 percent of the vote.

See also
Mayors of Newark, New Jersey
Brick City (TV series)

References

External links
Councilman Ronald C. Rice official Municipal Council site
Councilman Ronald C. Rice official campaign site
Our Campaigns: Ronald C. Rice

1968 births
Living people
American University alumni
Members of the Municipal Council of Newark
New Jersey Democrats
New Jersey lawyers
Pingry School alumni
Seton Hall University School of Law alumni
Lawyers from Newark, New Jersey